Abdulhadi H. Taher (1930-2013) was a Saudi Arabian oil executive and author. He was the Director General of the Saudi Arabian Ministry of Petroleum and Minerals.

Early life and education
Taher was born in Medina in 1930 to a family of limited means. He earned his PhD in Business Administration from what is now the Haas School of Business at the University of California, Berkeley in 1964. Taher died in 2013.

Career
Taher was described as "one of the most powerful figures" in Saudi Arabia. He spent his career working in both the public and private sectors. He served as the Director General of the Saudi Arabian Ministry of Petroleum and Minerals, the government-owned corporation that develops the Mideast nation's petroleum, petrochemical and mineral industries.  He was also the founder of the Al-Taher Group, a collection of companies that focus on construction, engineering, trading and real estate ventures in Saudi Arabia. The Al-Taher Group employs a workforce of more than 2500 employees based throughout the Arab region. Taher served as a board member of Saudi Aramco and as the governor and founding director general of the Petromin Corporation.

Taher was a major shareholder in Gulf Oil the multinational oil company, alongside the Hinduja group.

Taher lectured at the business school at King Saud University in Riyadh.

Taher was a Knight of Thailand. He was ennobled by King Bhumibol Adulyadej in 1980.

In 2002, Taher established an endowed chair at The American University in Cairo. The Abdulhadi H. Taher Chair in Comparative Religions was situated within the Department of History at the American University. The Chair was dedicated to the academic study of comparative religious history and theory.

Family
Abdulhadi Taher was the father of Tarek Taher.

Published works
Taher has authored or co-authored four books.

Monographs
 (2013). Energy, A Global Outlook: The Case for Effective International Co-operation. Oxford: Pergamon Press.
 (2011). Petroleum, Gas and Development Strategies of Saudi Arabia: Income Determination in the International Petroleum Industry. London: Saqi Books.
 (2008). Income Determination in the International Petroleum Industry. London: Saqi Books.

Co-authored monographs
 (2013). Co-authored with Michael Matthews. Saudi Arabian Hydrocarbons and World Affairs. London: Saqi Books.

References

Abdulhadi
Abdulhadi
1930 births
2013 deaths
Businesspeople in the oil industry
Haas School of Business alumni
People from Medina
Saudi Arabian business executives